Marks Gate is an area in Little Heath in Ilford at the northern tip of the London Borough of Barking and Dagenham in East London, England. It is located immediately north of Chadwell Heath and to the west of Romford.

The name originally referred to an entrance or gate into Hainault Forest at the northern end of the current Whalebone Lane North, the name being derived from the proximity of the gate to the manor of Marks (later Marks Hall) which stood on what is now Warren Hall Farm. As with many old houses the name was derived from the de Merk family who built the original manor in the 14th Century.

The oldest evidence for a settlement in this location is of a fortified village on the hilltop around 600 BC, and by 1777 Marks Gate was shown on maps as a hamlet on the southern edge of Hainault Forest. Subsequent development in the 1950s has overtaken two other gates to the forest, at Roselane Gate at the northern end of Rose Lane, and a further gate at Padnall Corner.

Scenes for the 2009 box office hit Harry Brown starring London actor Michael Caine and soul music singer Plan B, were filmed here. Famous ex-residents include David Essex who lived in Padnall Road.

Nearest stations
Newbury Park tube station
Chadwell Heath railway station

References

Districts of the London Borough of Barking and Dagenham
Ilford